Tippi is a feminine given name. Notable people with the name are as follows:

People
 Tippi Degré (born 1990), French writer
 Tippi Hedren (born 1930), American Hollywood actress and animal rights activist
 Tippi McCullough (born 1963), American politician

Fictional characters
Tippi, character in Satisfaction (Australian TV series)
Tippi, Pixl in the game Super Paper Mario
Tippie, dog in Cap Stubbs and Tippie, an American syndicated comic strip

Feminine given names